Halifax Speedway were a British motorcycle speedway team who operated between 1928 and 1930 and were based at Thrum Hall Cricket Ground, Spring Hall Lane, Halifax, West Yorkshire. England.

History
The Thrum Hall cricket ground had a speedway dirt track constructed around the cricket pitch in 1928 and hosted the speedway fixtures until 1930. The team competed in the inaugural 1929 Speedway English Dirt Track League, finishing in third place.

Halifax decided not to enter a team for the 1930 season and the following year the track was demolished to make way for a greyhound track that became the Halifax Greyhound Stadium.

Notable riders
Walter Creasor
Cyril "Squib" Burton

Season summary

References

Defunct British speedway teams